is a Japanese former Nippon Professional Baseball pitcher.

References 

1981 births
Living people
Baseball people from Tokushima Prefecture 
Meiji University alumni
Japanese baseball players
Nippon Professional Baseball pitchers
Yokohama BayStars players
Yokohama DeNA BayStars players
Japanese baseball coaches
Nippon Professional Baseball coaches